Purpuraturris undosa is a species of sea snail, a marine gastropod mollusk in the family Turridae, the turrids.

Description

Distribution

References

  Lamarck J.B. (1816). Liste des objets représentés dans les planches de cette livraison. In: Tableau encyclopédique et méthodique des trois règnes de la Nature. Mollusques et Polypes divers. Agasse, Paris. 16 pp

External links
 Tapparone Canefri, C. (1878). Catalogue des coquilles rapportées de la Nouvelle-Guinée par M. Raffray. Bulletin de la Société Zoologique de France. 3: 244-277, pl. 6.
 Chase, K., Watkins, M., Safavi-Hemami, H. & Olivera, B. M. (2022). Integrating venom peptide libraries into a phylogenetic and broader biological framework. Frontiers in Molecular Biosciences. 9: 784419

undosa
Gastropods described in 1816